is a Japanese footballer currently studying at the Osaka University of Economics.

Career statistics

Club
.

Notes

References

External links

2002 births
Living people
Sportspeople from Tottori Prefecture
Association football people from Tottori Prefecture
Osaka University of Economics alumni
Japanese footballers
Association football midfielders
J3 League players
Gainare Tottori players